The 2005–06 season of the Slovak Second Football League (also known as 2. liga) was the thirteenth season of the league since its establishment. It began on 22 July 2005 and ended on 28 May 2006.

League standing

See also
2005–06 Slovak Superliga

External links
 Tables and results at www.liga.cz

2. Liga (Slovakia) seasons
2005–06 in Slovak football
Slovak